Soufiane Benjdida (Arabic: سفيان بنجديدة; born 5 September 2001) is a Moroccan professional footballer who plays as a forward for Raja CA and the Moroccan Olympic team of which he's the captain.

References

External links

2001 births
Living people
Footballers from Casablanca
Moroccan footballers
Association football forwards
Raja CA players
Botola players